Aguinaldo Jaime (born January 15, 1954) is an Angolan political figure and economist. He served as Minister of Finance from June 1990 to April 1992, President of the African Investment Bank (beginning in 1996), and as Central Bank Governor from 1999 to 2002. He was subsequently Deputy Prime Minister. He is also alumnus of London School of Economics.

External links
Angola.org

References

Alumni of the London School of Economics
Angolan economists
1954 births
Living people
Finance ministers of Angola
Governors of the Bank of Angola
MPLA politicians